Leahey is a surname. Notable people with the surname include:

Harry Leahey (born 1935), jazz guitarist and guitar teacher who lived, taught and performed primarily in New Jersey
Kanoa Leahey, Hawaiian Sportscaster/Sports Director for the KHON-TV Honolulu Fox Affiliate
Mimi Leahey, American television soap opera script writer
Patrick Joseph Leahy, Democratic senator for Vermont, USA